Hines is an unincorporated community in Greenbrier County, West Virginia, United States. Hines is located on U.S. Route 60, northwest of Rupert.

Climate
The climate in this area has mild differences between highs and lows, and there is adequate rainfall year-round.  According to the Köppen Climate Classification system, Hines has a marine west coast climate, abbreviated "Cfb" on climate maps.

References

Unincorporated communities in Greenbrier County, West Virginia
Unincorporated communities in West Virginia